Rajinder Paul Loomba, Baron Loomba,  (born 13 November 1943, Dhilwan, Punjab, India) is a philanthropist, founder and executive chairman of clothing company Loomba Group, and a member of the House of Lords.

Life and career
Loomba was born as one of seven children in Dhilwan, in the state of Punjab, India. He was educated at D.A.V. College, Jallandhar and at the University of Iowa; his family moved to England in 1962. Loomba built up his fashion business from scratch, graduating from a stall at Widnes market to a shop, a wholesale business and then an import company, Rinku Group Ltd. The company has over 200 retail concession outlets in the UK, offices in London, Delhi and China, and supplies major retail groups.

Loomba is a member of the Rotary Club in London, the Institute of Directors and is a Freeman of the City of London. He is Chairman of the Friends of the Three Faiths Forum, is Patron of Children In Need India, and is the Founding Patron of the World Punjabi Organisation. He is Vice President of Barnardo’s and of the Safer London Foundation, a charity backed by the Metropolitan Police. In 1997 he was named Asian of the Year UK by Asian Who's Who International.

Loomba is married to Veena Chaudhry, with whom he has two daughters and one son.

Charity work
Loomba has become well known for his fundraising and campaigning concerning the issue of widowhood in the developing world. His mother, Shrimati Pushpa Wati Loomba, was widowed at the age of 37 in India, and Loomba experienced first-hand the social and economic discrimination that widows in that country faced.

It was in his mother’s memory that Loomba set up his charity, The Loomba Foundation, which works to raise awareness of the issue of widowhood and which raises funds to educate the children of poor widows in India and empower widows in other developing countries in south Asia and across Africa. The flagship of the charity’s awareness campaign is International Widows Day, which takes place annually on 23 June, the anniversary of his mother’s widowhood. Following a sustained campaign, on 21 December 2010 the United Nations General Assembly formally recognised, by unanimous acclaim, 23 June as International Widows Day.

In recognition of his contribution to charity, in the 2008 Birthday Honours Loomba was appointed a Commander of the Order of the British Empire (CBE); he received his award from Prince Charles at a ceremony at Buckingham Palace.

House of Lords
On 12 January 2011 Loomba was ennobled as a life peer with the name, style and title of Baron Loomba, of Moor Park in the county of Hertfordshire. He took up his seat in the House of Lords on 13 January 2011, representing the Liberal Democrats. He was introduced to the House on 17 January 2011, supported by the Lords McNally and Dholakia. On 21 January 2011 he gave his maiden speech in the House during a debate on the Rehabilitation of Offenders (Amendment) Bill.

In December 2016, Lord Loomba left the Liberal Democrats and now sits as a non-affiliated Peer.  Explaining his decision he said: "I now wish to concentrate on issues such as human rights, gender equality, education and above all the United Nations’ 2030 Sustainable Development Goals".

References

External links
 Lord Loomba - website of the Liberal Democrats
 The Loomba Foundation
 International Widows Day
 Rinku Group Ltd

1943 births
Living people
University of Iowa alumni
Liberal Democrats (UK) life peers
Indian emigrants to England
People from Kapurthala
British politicians of Indian descent
Commanders of the Order of the British Empire
Naturalised citizens of the United Kingdom
Recipients of Pravasi Bharatiya Samman
Life peers created by Elizabeth II